Euromarque Motorsport Park (often referred to as Ruapuna) is a permanent motor racing circuit owned and operated by the Canterbury Car Club Inc on land leased from the Christchurch City Council. It was opened as Ruapana Park in 1963, and between 2004 and 2013 was known as Powerbuilt Raceway at Ruapuna Park. Mike Pero joined the circuit as title sponsor from 2013-2023, as Mike Pero Motorsport Park. In the early parts of February 2023, the sponsorship deal was over, and Euromarque became the new title sponsor.

The track also features a drag strip, pit garages, racing school, speedway circuit and even a radio controlled car circuit. There are a number of configurations of the circuit with licences from FIA Grade 3 to National grades 1, 2 and 3.

History
The track was opened in November 1963. The circuit was a fairly simple sealed surface road course, at just a mile in length and comprising essentially a flat tri-oval with an extended main straight down to a hairpin bend. In 1976 the main straight was widened and a staging area added to allow drag racing to take place.

The circuit
It rewards smooth and tidy drivers.

It supports six layouts, from the  "A Track" to the  "Grand Prix with dipper".

The track features on the motorsport racing simulation game Project CARS 2 as Ruapana Park.

Layout History & Track Configurations

Events
The circuit hosts both 2 and 4 wheeled events. The "Skope Classic" is a major annual event held at the track. The two-day-event includes practice and racing on Saturday and racing in classes on Sunday for classic and historic cars. It is one of the events of Southern Festival of Speed.

The track hosted the New Zealand Grand Prix in 1998 and 1999. New Zealand born driver Simon Wills won both races in his Reynard 94D.

Naming rights
Since 2013, Mike Pero, founder of Mike Pero Mortgages and Real Estate, has had a naming rights sponsorship deal to Ruapuna, which was known as Mike Pero Motorsport Park. This deal ended in 2023, with Euromarque replacing.

For 10 years before, the naming rights had been held by Powerbuilt Tools.

Lap Records 

The official lap record for the Euromarque Motorsport Park is 1:15.810, set by Scott Dixon on 5 December 1998. While the unofficial all-time track record is 1:11.265, set by Liam Lawson on 21 January 2022. The official race lap records at the Euromarque Motorsport Park are listed as:

Notes

References

External links
 Canterbury Car Club Official website
Ruapuna Park in Google Maps

Ruapuna
Ruapuna
Ruapuna
New Zealand Grand Prix